The 2021–22 season is AaB's 39th consecutive season in the top flight of Danish football, 32nd consecutive season in the Danish Superliga, and 136th year in existence as a football club.

Club

Coaching staff 

{| class="wikitable"
!Position
!Staff
|-
|Head coach|| Martí Cifuentes
|-
|Assistant coaches|| Rasmus Würtz Oscar Hiljemark
|-
|Head of football|| Søren Krogh
|-
|Goalkeeping coach|| Poul Buus
|-
|Analyst|| Jim Holm Larsen
|-
|Psychological consultent|| Martin Langagergaard
|-
|Team leader|| Ernst Damborg
|-
|Doctor|| Jens Lykkegaard Olesen
|-
|Physiotherapist|| Morten Skjoldager
|-
|Physical trainer|| Ashley Tootle (until 31 July 2021) Javier Durán
|-

Other information 

|-

Squad

First team squad 

This squad list includes any first team squad player who has been available for the line-up during the season.

Source: AaB Fodbold website

Youth players in use 

This list includes any youth player from AaB Academy who has been used in the season.

Transfers and loans

In

Summer

Winter

Out

Summer

Winter

Loan in

Loan out

Friendlies

Pre-season

Mid-season

Competitions

Competition record

Superliga

Results summary

Regular season

Matches

Championship Round

Danish Cup

Statistics

Appearances 

This includes all competitive matches. The list is sorted by shirt number when appearances are equal.

Goalscorers 

This includes all competitive matches. The list is sorted by shirt number when total goals are equal.

Assists 

This includes all competitive matches. The list is sorted by shirt number when total assists are equal.

Clean sheets 

This includes all competitive matches. The list is sorted by shirt number when total clean sheets are equal.

Disciplinary record 

This includes all competitive matches. The list is sorted by shirt number when total cards are equal.

Suspensions 

This includes all competitive matches. The list is sorted by shirt number when total matches suspended are equal.

Awards

Team

Individual

References

2021-22
Danish football clubs 2021–22 season